Ray Delorenzi (born June 14, 1952) is a retired professional ice hockey player who played in 42 games in the World Hockey Association with the Vancouver Blazers and Calgary Cowboys.

Awards and honors

References

External links

1952 births
Living people
Calgary Cowboys players
Ice hockey people from Ontario
Johnstown Jets players
Notre Dame Fighting Irish men's ice hockey players
Sault Ste. Marie Greyhounds players
Sportspeople from Sault Ste. Marie, Ontario
Tulsa Oilers (1964–1984) players
Vancouver Blazers players
Canadian expatriate ice hockey players in the United States
Canadian ice hockey right wingers